The Gary Tigers were an American soccer club based in Gary, Indiana who were a member of the American Soccer League. For the 1974 season, the team was renamed the Indiana Tigers. Their head coach was Rosario Cammarata.

Year-by-year

American Soccer League (1933–1983) teams
Defunct soccer clubs in Indiana
1973 establishments in Indiana
1974 disestablishments in Indiana
Soccer clubs in Indiana
Association football clubs established in 1973
Association football clubs disestablished in 1974
Sports in Gary, Indiana